In eighth-dimensional Euclidean geometry, the 8-simplex honeycomb is a space-filling tessellation (or honeycomb). The tessellation fills space by 8-simplex, rectified 8-simplex, birectified 8-simplex, and trirectified 8-simplex facets. These facet types occur in proportions of 1:1:1:1 respectively in the whole honeycomb.

A8 lattice 
This vertex arrangement is called the A8 lattice or 8-simplex lattice. The 72 vertices of the expanded 8-simplex vertex figure represent the 72 roots of the  Coxeter group.  It is the 8-dimensional case of a simplectic honeycomb. Around each vertex figure are 510 facets: 9+9 8-simplex, 36+36 rectified 8-simplex, 84+84 birectified 8-simplex, 126+126 trirectified 8-simplex, with the count distribution from the 10th row of Pascal's triangle.

 contains  as a subgroup of index 5760.

The A lattice is the union of three A8 lattices, and also identical to the E8 lattice.
  ∪  ∪  = .

The A lattice (also called A) is the union of nine A8 lattices, and has the vertex arrangement of the dual honeycomb to the omnitruncated 8-simplex honeycomb, and therefore the Voronoi cell of this lattice is an omnitruncated 8-simplex

 ∪
 ∪
 ∪
 ∪
 ∪
 ∪
 ∪
 ∪

Related polytopes and honeycombs

Projection by folding 

The 8-simplex honeycomb can be projected into the 4-dimensional tesseractic honeycomb by a geometric folding operation that maps two pairs of mirrors into each other, sharing the same vertex arrangement:

See also 
 Regular and uniform honeycombs in 8-space:
8-cubic honeycomb
8-demicubic honeycomb
Truncated 8-simplex honeycomb
521 honeycomb
251 honeycomb
152 honeycomb

Notes

References 
 Norman Johnson Uniform Polytopes, Manuscript (1991)
 Kaleidoscopes: Selected Writings of H. S. M. Coxeter, edited by F. Arthur Sherk, Peter McMullen, Anthony C. Thompson, Asia Ivic Weiss, Wiley-Interscience Publication, 1995,  
 (Paper 22) H.S.M. Coxeter, Regular and Semi Regular Polytopes I, [Math. Zeit. 46 (1940) 380–407, MR 2,10] (1.9 Uniform space-fillings)
 (Paper 24) H.S.M. Coxeter, Regular and Semi-Regular Polytopes III, [Math. Zeit. 200 (1988) 3–45]

Honeycombs (geometry)
9-polytopes